Honarstan-e Kashavarzi may refer to:
 Honarstan-e Kashavarzi, Hormozgan
 Honarstan-e Kashavarzi, Razavi Khorasan